2014–15 NCAA Division I women's ice hockey rankings.

Two polls make up the 2014–15 NCAA Division I women's ice hockey rankings, the USCHO.com/CBS College Sports poll and the USA Today/USA Hockey Magazine poll. As the 2014–15 season progresses, rankings are updated weekly.

USCHO

USA Today

References

External links

2014–15 NCAA Division I women's hockey season
College women's ice hockey rankings in the United States